Kananu Kirimi (born 1977) is a British actress.

Biography
Kirimi was born in Nairobi, Kenya, of a Kenyan mother and Scottish father. She was educated at Strathallan School in Perthshire and then took a three-year course at the London Academy of Music and Dramatic Art.

Kirimi's career developed as a classical actor in the theatre taking roles such as Viola in the Royal Shakespeare Company's Twelfth Night and in Adrian Noble's 2002 Pericles, Prince of Tyre. She received a commendation at the 2002 Ian Charleson Awards for her performance in Pericles. In 2004, she played Juliet in the Globe Theatre's first original pronunciation production.

Film credits include the 2006 film The Queen. In 2008, she starred as locum Dr. Joan Makori in the ITV1 drama series The Royal.

Filmography

Film

Television

References

External links

Kananu Kirimi at the British Film Institute

1977 births
Living people
People educated at Strathallan School
Alumni of the London Academy of Music and Dramatic Art
Scottish television actresses
People from Skye and Lochalsh
Black British actresses
Scottish people of Kenyan descent
Kenyan people of Scottish descent
Scottish stage actresses
21st-century Scottish actresses
British Shakespearean actresses
Royal Shakespeare Company members